Onepoto may refer to:
 Onepoto, Hawke's Bay, a small settlement near Lake Waikaremoana
 Onepoto, Wellington, a suburb of Porirua, New Zealand
 Onepoto (volcanic crater), a feature near Northcote in Auckland, New Zealand
 Onepoto Bridge, a bridge in Auckland, New Zealand
 Te Onepoto / Taylors Mistake is a beach and bach community on Banks Peninsula, New Zealand